Amritsar West Assembly constituency (Sl. No.: 16) is a Punjab Legislative Assembly constituency in Amritsar district, Punjab state, India.

Members of Legislative Assembly

Election results

2022

2017

References

External links
 

Assembly constituencies of Punjab, India
Amritsar district